The 1999 winners of the Torneo di Viareggio (in English, the Viareggio Tournament, officially the Viareggio Cup World Football Tournament Coppa Carnevale), the annual youth football tournament held in Viareggio, Tuscany, are listed below.

Format
The 32 teams are seeded in 8 groups. Each team from a group meets the others in a single tie. The winning club and runners-up from each group progress to the final knockout stage. All matches in the final rounds are single tie. The Round of 16 envisions penalties and no extra time, while the rest of the final round matches include 30 minutes extra time and penalties to be played if the draw between teams still holds. Semifinal losing teams play 3rd-place final with penalties after regular time. The winning sides play the final with extra time and repeat the match if the draw holds.

Participating teams
Italian teams

  Bari
  Cagliari
  Como
  Empoli
  Fiorentina
  Genoa
  Inter Milan
  Juventus
  Lazio
  Milan
  Napoli
  Parma
  Perugia
  Roma
  Siena
  Torino
  Udinese

European teams

  Bayern München
  Werder Bremen
  Varteks
  Benfica

African teams
  Okwawu United
American teams

  Pumas
  Boca Juniors
  River Plate
  All Boys
  Central Córdoba
  Miami Breakers
  Vitória
  Comercial
  Irineu

Oceanian teams
  Marconi Stallions

Group stage

Group 1

Group 2

Group 3

Group 4

Group 5

Group 6

Group 7

Group 8

Knockout stage

Champions

Footnotes

External links
 Official Site (Italian)
 Results on RSSSF.com

1998
1998–99 in Italian football
1998–99 in German football
1998–99 in Portuguese football
1998–99 in Croatian football
1998–99 in Ghanaian football
1998–99 in Argentine football
1998–99 in Mexican football
1998 in Brazilian football
1999 in Australian soccer
1999 in American soccer